Frederick Drach Tappert (April 21, 1940 – January 9, 2002) was an American physicist whose primary contributions were in underwater acoustics.  He is noted for the development of the parabolic equation model and split-step Fourier algorithm for electromagnetic and ocean acoustic propagation.

Fred Tappert was born in April 1940 to Rev. Dr. Theodore Gerhardt Tappert and Helen Carson Tappert.  As a child, Fred lived with his family on the campus of the Lutheran Theological Seminary in the Germantown neighborhood of Northwest Philadelphia.  He attended Central High School in Philadelphia and Pennsylvania State University. Growing up, his father "often mentioned the satisfaction that would result from the pursuit of knowledge for its own sake."

Tappert began his scientific career in the field of plasma physics, receiving his Ph.D. from Princeton University in 1967.   His dissertation, entitled "Kinetic theory of equilibrium plasmas", was supervised by Edward A. Frieman, then Associate Director of the Princeton Plasma Physics Laboratory.

He was a member of the technical staff of Bell Telephone Labs from
1967 to 1974.  Among his notable accomplishments there was a collaboration with Akira Hasegawa on optical solitons which underpinned later advances in fiber-optic communication technology.

Following his years at Bell Labs, Tappert was a Senior Research Scientist at the Courant Institute of New York University from
1974 to 1978.  He moved to Coral Gables, Florida in 1978 to join the faculty of the University of Miami, where he had a joint appointment in the Department of Physics on the main campus and in the Department of Applied Marine Physics at the Rosenstiel School of Marine and Atmospheric Science (RSMAS).

In 2001, he was awarded the Department of the Navy's Superior Public Service Award, the citation of which noted, "Professor Tappert's introduction of the parabolic equation propagation model in 1974 started a revolution in the
underwater acoustics modeling community. ... It is, in large part, a tribute to Professor Tappert's superb efforts that today the PE model is the de facto standard full wave propagation model in underwater acoustics and that, in a practical sense, he is thought of as the 'father of the PE model'."

Tappert was posthumously awarded the Pioneer in Underwater Acoustics Medal by the Acoustical Society of America, "for application of the parabolic equation to underwater acoustic propagation."

  The 145th Annual Meeting of the Acoustical Society, in 2003, featured a memorial session dedicated to Frederick Tappert on the subject of "Propagation Phenomena and the Parabolic Equation."

References

External links
 Technical Report on UMPE: The University of Miami Parabolic Equation Model, Version 1.0. (1993)
 "The Energy-Conserving Property of the Standard PE", Ding Lee and Er-Shang Chang. This article was dedicated to Frederick Tappert and includes biographical information.

20th-century American physicists
1940 births
2002 deaths
People from Coral Gables, Florida
Princeton University alumni
University of Miami faculty